St. Paul’s Girls' School is a National school for girls situated in Milagiriya, Colombo 05. The school was founded on 14 January 1887 as a Parish school affiliated to St. Paul's Church (Milagiriya) with 24 students and 4 teachers and the first principal was Ms. Stella Coban (1887 – 1892). In the early years of the school the majority of the students belonged to the Burger community and the medium of education was English. In 1957 the school provided education in Sinhala, Tamil and English mediums.

The school was taken over by the state on 15 December 1961. The school was announced as a Buddhist school in 1964. The annual pirith chanting program was inaugurated in 1966 during the administration of principal Mrs. Barbara Gunaasekara. In 1984 a sapling of the Sri Mahabodhi was planted in the school grounds, during the time of principal Ms. K. Pitigala.

In February 1993 during the administration of principal Mrs. Gothami Fernando, the school was declared a National School. Today the school has more than 4,500 students with 150 academic staff and 25 non-academic staff.

Principals
The following are principals from the time of foundation to the present:
Stella Coban (1887-1922) 
Eda Ondatchi (1922-1937)
Agnes Spittel (1937-1940)
Honor Rover (1940-1947)
Thelma Bud Jansz (1947-1955)
E. P. Roper (1955-1958)
Grace Paul (1958-1964)
Pearl Ratnayake (1964-1967)
Barbara Gunasekera (1967-1985)
K. Pitigala (1985-1989)
Hema Wellalage (1989-1990)
Gothami Fernando (1990-1995) 
I. P. Alahakoon (1995-2004 ) 
Geetha Gunawardena (2004-2014)
Sumedha Jayaweera  (2015–present)

Notable alumni

General References 

National schools in Sri Lanka
Girls' schools in Sri Lanka
Schools in Colombo